John Westbrooke (1616 - 7 June  1666) was an English landowner and politician who sat in the House of Commons in 1659 and 1660.

Westbrooke was the eldest surviving son of Caleb Westbrooke of Witley and his wife Phoebe Taylor, daughter of Francis Taylor of Godalming, Surrey. He was baptised on 1 September 1616. He succeeded to the estate of Witley on the death of his father in  1635. In 1649 he became commissioner for assessment and J.P. for Surrey until 1652. In 1650 he was a captain of militia horse and by 1651 he was a commissioner for militia. He was a JP again from 1654 to July 1660 and was commissioner for assessment in 1657.

In 1659, Westbrooke was elected Member of Parliament for Haslemere in the Third Protectorate Parliament. He was commissioner for militia in March 1660 and a captain of militia infantry in April 1660. In April 1660, he was re-elected MP for Haslemere for the Convention Parliament. He was commissioner for assessment from August 1660 to 1661.

Westbrooke died at the age of  49 and was buried at Ferring.

Westbrooke married  Barbara Watersfield daughter of William Watersfield of West Ferring on 17 July 1637. They had four sons and two daughters. She died in 1657.

References

1616 births
1666 deaths
People from Haslemere
English MPs 1659
English MPs 1660